In Canadian folklore, the Ogopogo is a lake monster said to inhabit Okanagan Lake in British Columbia, Canada. Some scholars have charted the entity's development from First Nations folklore and widespread water monster folklore motifs. The Ogopogo now plays a role in the commercial symbolism and media representation of the region.

Background

Okanagan Lake is the largest of five inter-connected freshwater fjord lakes in the Okanagan Valley in British Columbia. Named after the First Nations people who first inhabited the area, it was created when melting glaciers flooded a valley 10,000 years ago. Okanagan has frozen over during eight winters in the last 110 years.

The lake monster has been mostly described as being a serpentine creature with smooth dark skin with a large body thicker than a telephone pole and being up to 50 ft in length. The monster has said to move at incredible speeds coiling its body in vertical undulations and propelling itself with a powerful tail.

Etymology

According to historian Mark M. Orkin, the creature received its name "on a night in 1924 when the strains of an English music-hall song were first heard in the city of Vernon, British Columbia". Orkin cites the following lines from the song:
His mother was an earwig,
His father was a whale;
A little bit of head
And hardly any tail—
And Ogopogo was his name.
Orkin, however, notes that "A somewhat different form of the song appeared in the Vancouver Province in 1912, August 24, 1926. According to the DC the name was first applied in 1912." Additionally, the creature may sometimes be referred to by the pet name Oggy. Smaller creatures may be referred to as Ogopups.

History

Native origins

According to Radford, the Ogopogo is "more closely tied to native myths than is any other lake monster." The Secwepemc and Syilx natives regarded the Ogopogo, which they called the Naitaka, as "an evil supernatural entity with great power and ill intent." The word "n'ha-a-itk" has various translations, such as "water-demon", "water god", or "sacred creature of the water". In native lore, Naitaka demanded a live sacrifice for safe crossing of the lake. For hundreds of years, First Nations would sacrifice small animals before entering the water. Oral traditions often described visiting chief Timbasket, who rejected the required sacrifice, denying the existence of the demon. Upon entering the lake on a canoe with his family, Naitaka "whipped up the surface of the lake with his long tail" and the canoe and its occupants were sucked to the bottom of the lake. The Naitaka was often described as using its tail to create fierce storms to drown victims. In 1855, settler John MacDougal claimed that his horses were sucked down into the water, and nearly his canoe before he cut the line.

According to Pat Raphael of the Westbank First Nation, a member nation of the larger Okanagan Nation Alliance, the demonic view of Naitaka came about through miscommunication between Canada's early European settlers and the Syilx/Okanagan people. To the Syilx, it's n ̓x̌ax̌aitkʷ (n-ha-ha-it-koo), a sacred spirit of the lake that protects the valley. The spirit was said to dwell in caves under Rattlesnake Island (a.k.a. Monster Island) or adjacent to Squally Point.

Alleged sightings

Susan Allison's 1872 sighting was the first detailed Ogopogo account from a white settler. She was the first non-native person to live in the region, establishing relations with the native peoples.

While driving on Highway 97 in 1968, Art Folden noticed something moving in the lake. He pulled off the road and filmed what he claimed to be footage of the alleged creature, showing a large wake moving across the water. Folden estimated that the Ogopogo was 300 yards offshore. A computer analysis of the footage concluded it was a solid, three-dimensional object. Folden noticed "something large and lifelike"; in the distance out on the calm water and pulled out his home movie camera to capture the object. A 2005 investigation conducted by Benjamin Radford with Joe Nickell and John Kirk for the National Geographic Channel TV show Is It Real?, utilized surveyor boats to find the actual distance of the alleged creature from the shore. They found that it was much closer to shore than originally thought, resulting in a reduction of actual size and speed. They concluded that it was likely a real animal but its size had been greatly overestimated and that it was probably a water fowl, otter, or beaver too far away to be identified.

In the 1980s, a local tourism agency offered a cash reward for a proven sighting of the beast. Greenpeace announced that the beast must be filmed and not captured; the Ogopogo was listed as an endangered species. In 1980, around 50 tourists watched an alleged Ogopogo for about 45 minutes off a beach at Kelowna. Larry Thal, a tourist from Vancouver, shot some 8mm film, albeit for only 10 seconds. Some skeptics have suggested that it was only a pair of otters.

A boat towing a water skier suddenly appears in frame and the skier falls into the water near the object. Within several minutes, DeMara made two other videotapes, each showing what appeared to be multiple animals in the water. Benjamin Radford suggested that the creature was only several otters. In 2005, FBI video specialist Grant Fredricks  concluded that the object "was very consistent with debris from a fallen tree in the water," noting that it "very slowly bobs up and down." He also pointed out that the alleged creature did not react to the water skier, and the skier did not seem alarmed.

In August 2008, a local photographer Sean Viloria and his girl friend Jessica Weagers were sitting by the lake shore of Peachland as she noticed a disturbance in the water. Sean snapped one photograph, but his camera had died, and wasn't able to capture more. Sean never publicized it, but described it as having black hump like ridges. Eight days later south of the original sighting, Sean pulled his car over to look at the Highway 97 widening project, and Jessica spotted another disturbance. He snapped 11 photographs of the unknown object as it was surfacing near a boat.(However Sean has only shown 3-4 images to the public) One of them shows a tail or neck like object surfacing the water while the others show the back and head of the creature. Sean estimated the creature being 18–20 ft long estimated from the boat in the background. The photos were examined by many local experts. Chris Bull who ran the local fishing department, and cataloged every single species of the lake concluded it didn't look like any known animal of the lake. A Biologist noted the black/red texture was possibly a different creature or pollution. Members of the show Monster Quest also examined the photographs and found no evidence of tampering. The photos wouldn't be shown to television until 2009 on Monster Quest's episode Lake Demons. Viloria would end up making a little Ogopogo statue off of a Plesiosaur.

In 2011, a cell phone video captured two dark shapes in the water. A suggested explanation is that the video shows two logs. Radford analyzed the video for Discovery News and concluded that “The video quality is poor and the camera is shaky, but a closer look at the 30-second video reveals that, instead of one long object, there are actually two shorter ones, and they seem to be floating next to each other at slightly different angles. There are no humps, nor head, nor form; only two long, darkish, more or less straight forms that appear to be a few dozen feet long. In short, they look a lot like floating logs, which would not be surprising since Okanagan Lake has tens of thousands of logs harvested by the timber industry floating just under the lake's surface."

Explanations

According to skeptical author Benjamin Radford, contemporary sightings of Ogopogo were most likely misidentifications of water fowl, otter, or beaver, adding, "[the First Nations stories] were not referring to a literal lake monster like Ogopogo, but instead to a legendary water spirit. Though the supernatural N'ha-a-itk of the Okanagan Valley Indians are long gone, a decidedly less fearsome — and more biological — beast, whose exact form is a matter of debate, has replaced it.". Joe Nickel and Benjamin Radford propose an origin in claims of "sightings" in wildlife in the region. Otters often swim in a row and their motion can often be mistaken for one continuous serpent. Radford pointed to John Kirk's 1989 sighting as likely being a group of otters.

Sturgeon are often mistaken as lake monsters, but their existence in Okanagan is unclear. There is currently an unclaimed $10,000 dollar reward for concrete evidence of sturgeon in Okanagan.

Benjamin Radford has pointed to waterspouts as a likely source of inspiration for First Nation myths. Waterspouts are fairly common on Okanagan Lake, often forming when air temperatures drop and the lake still has a relatively warm water temperature.

However some people have claimed it to be a surviving Basilosaurus, a prehistoric whale that has been described as long and somewhat serpentine like. However, this theory has been mostly debunked as most fossils have been found in Egypt and it went extinct 35 million years ago. Additionally, Okanagan Lake gets very cold in the winter likely making it impossible for a whale like creature that has been adapted to salt water to live there.

See also
 Igopogo, said to live in Lake Simcoe, Ontario
 Loch Ness Monster
 Manipogo, said to live in Lake Manitoba, Manitoba
 Memphre, said to live in Lake Memphremagog, Quebec
 Seelkee, said to live in the swamps of what is now Chilliwack, in British Columbia
 Underwater panther, a mythological water-being common in North-American Indian lore
 List of cryptids
 List of reported lake monsters

References

Bibliography
 Gaal, Arlene (2001) In Search of Ogopogo. Hancock House, Surrey, British Columbia
 Gaal, Arlene (1986) Ogopogo: The True Story of The Okanagan Lake Million Dollar Monster. Hancock House, Surrey, BC.
 Moon, Mary (1977) Ogopogo. Douglas Ltd., North Vancouver, British Columbia.
 Nickell, Joe (2006) "Ogopogo: The Lake Okangan Monster". Skeptical Inquirer, 30(1): 16–19.
 Radford, Benjamin (2006) "Ogopogo the Chameleon". Skeptical Inquirer, 30(1): 41–46.
 Radford, Benjamin and Nickell, Joe (2006) Lake Monster Mysteries: Investigating the World’s Most Elusive Creatures. University Press of Kentucky, Lexington, Kentucky.
 Salmonson, Jessica Amanda (1992) The Mysterious Doom and Other Ghostly Tales of the Pacific Northwest: 149. Sasquatch Books, Seattle, Washington.

External links

Articles containing video clips
Culture of British Columbia
Canadian folklore
Okanagan
Cascadian folklore
Canadian legendary creatures
Legendary creatures of the indigenous peoples of North America
Mythological aquatic creatures
Water monsters